Uno Naissoo (25 March 1928 Viljandi – 5 January 1980 Tallinn) was an Estonian composer and jazz musician.

In 1952, he graduated from Tallinn State Conservatory.

Bteween 1952–1980, he taught music theory subjects at Georg Ots Tallinn Music School.

He has directed several ensembles, including Swing Club (1947–1957), Rütmikud (1948–1950).

Since 1954, he was a member of Estonian Composers' Union.

His son is pianist and composer Tõnu Naissoo.

Awards
 1965 Estonian SSR Merited Art Worker
 1976 Annual Music Award of Estonian SSR
 1978 Estonian SSR People's Artist

Selected works

 7 jazz suites
 song "My home"
 song "When it’s Midsummer Day"
 song "The May began in March"

References

1928 births
1980 deaths
20th-century Estonian composers
Estonian songwriters
Estonian Academy of Music and Theatre alumni
People from Viljandi
Burials at Metsakalmistu